Aldo Ghira (4 April 1920 – 13 July 1991) was an Italian water polo player who competed in the 1948 Summer Olympics.

He was part of the Italian team which won the gold medal. He played all seven matches.

See also
 Italy men's Olympic water polo team records and statistics
 List of Olympic champions in men's water polo
 List of Olympic medalists in water polo (men)

External links
 
 

1920 births
1991 deaths
Italian male water polo players
Water polo players at the 1948 Summer Olympics
Olympic gold medalists for Italy in water polo
Medalists at the 1948 Summer Olympics
Sportspeople from Trieste